The Association of Children's Museums (ACM) is a Washington, D.C.–based organization that represents more than 300 children's museums in 23 countries throughout the world. The association began in 1962 as the American Association of Youth Museums and grew out of the desire for children's museums to meet as a separate group during the American Alliance of Museums' annual meeting. They remained an informal group, but their growth paralleled the growth of children's museums worldwide. In addition to organizing museums and administration of grants to museums, the Association partners with other organizations, including the Eunice Kennedy Shriver National Institute of Child Health and Human Development on health issues related to children.

Great Friend to Kids Award
The Association of Children's Museums initiated the Great Friend to Kids Award in 1991 to honor individuals who have made outstanding contributions toward strengthening education for children. National Great Friend to Kids Award winners include Fred Rogers ("Mister Rogers") and Marian Wright Edelman (president and founder of the Children's Defense Fund).

Membership

Select Association members:
 Boonshoft Museum of Discovery
 Boston Children's Museum 
 Chicago Children's Museum
 Discovery Place 
 The Magic House, St. Louis
 TELUS Spark

See also
List of children's museums in the United States (alphabetical)

References

External Links 

  

Museum associations and consortia
Organizations established in 1962
1962 establishments in the United States
Children's museums in Canada
Children's museums in the United Kingdom
Children's museums in the United States

Non-profit organizations based in Washington, D.C.
501(c)(3) organizations